Islambek Tsilimovich Albiev (born December 28, 1988, in Chechnya) is a Russian wrestler of Chechen descent, who won a gold medal at the 2008 Summer Olympics in Greco-Roman wrestling. Albiev is a World champion (2009) and two-time European champion (2009 and 2016).

References

External links
 

Living people
Russian male sport wrestlers
Olympic wrestlers of Russia
Wrestlers at the 2008 Summer Olympics
Wrestlers at the 2016 Summer Olympics
Olympic gold medalists for Russia
Russian people of Chechen descent
Sportspeople from Grozny
Olympic medalists in wrestling
Chechen martial artists
Chechen sportsmen
Medalists at the 2008 Summer Olympics
World Wrestling Championships medalists
World Wrestling Champions
Universiade medalists in wrestling
Universiade silver medalists for Russia
European Wrestling Champions
Russian State University of Physical Education, Sport, Youth and Tourism alumni
Medalists at the 2013 Summer Universiade
1988 births
21st-century Russian people